Marek Wacław Sawicki (born 8 April 1958) is a Polish politician. He was elected to the Sejm on 25 September 2005, receiving 6527 votes in 18 Siedlce district as a candidate on the Polish People's Party list and served as Minister of Agriculture and Rural Development on two occasions. He was first appointed to the post on 16 November 2007 and left on 26 July 2012. On 17 March 2014 he then took over from Stanisław Kalemba and served until the Cabinet of Beata Szydło was sworn in on 16 November 2015.

He was also a member of Sejm 1993-1997, Sejm 1997-2001, and Sejm 2001-2005.

On 15–16 December 2011 the European Council of Agriculture and Fisheries under the presidency of Marek Sawicki adopted a decision authorizing the signing of an anti-counterfeiting trade agreement (ACTA).

See also
Members of Polish Sejm 2005-2007

References

External links
Marek Sawicki in Polish Wikipedia
Marek Sawicki - parliamentary page - includes declarations of interest, voting record, and transcripts of speeches

Members of the Polish Sejm 1993–1997
Members of the Polish Sejm 1997–2001
Members of the Polish Sejm 2001–2005
Members of the Polish Sejm 2005–2007
Members of the Polish Sejm 2007–2011
Members of the Polish Sejm 2011–2015
Members of the Polish Sejm 2015–2019
Members of the Polish Sejm 2019–2023
Agriculture ministers of Poland
Polish People's Party politicians
1958 births
Living people